The Anacapa Island Archeological District, on Anacapa Island near Port Hueneme, California, is a  historic district that was listed on the National Register of Historic Places (NRHP) in 1979.  It included 26 separate contributing sites, where there was a village site, an animal facility, a manufacturing facility, or other evidence having potential to yield information in the future.

Anacapa Island has a history of human occupation by the Chumash people, who "camped on the islands thousands of years ago";  shell middens make up part of the evidence of them.

See also 
Anacapa Island Light Station, also NRHP-listed
Chumash people
National Register of Historic Places listings in Ventura County, California

References 

Chumash
Archaeological sites on the National Register of Historic Places in California
National Register of Historic Places in Ventura County, California
National Register of Historic Places in Channel Islands National Park
Historic districts on the National Register of Historic Places in California
1979 establishments in California